Milia en plaque is a cutaneous condition characterized by multiple milia within an erythematous edematous plaque.

See also 
 Micronodular basal cell carcinoma
 List of cutaneous conditions

References 

Epidermal nevi, neoplasms, and cysts